Pié La Costa is a frazione of Tornimparte, in the Province of L'Aquila in the Abruzzo, region of Italy.

Frazioni of the Province of L'Aquila
Tornimparte